The Pittsfield Building,  is a 38-story skyscraper located at 55 E. Washington Street in the Loop community area of Chicago, Illinois, United States, that was the city's tallest building at the time of its completion. The building was designated as a Chicago Landmark on November 6, 2002.

History
The property was developed by heirs of Marshall Field, and is named after Pittsfield, Massachusetts, where Marshall Field obtained his first job. While it is located in the Jewelers' Row Landmark District, the original design and occupancy was for medical & dental professionals, including offices, laboratories, and medical supplies. The nearby Burnham Center, at the intersection of Clark Street and Washington Street, was originally named the Conway Building after Conway, Massachusetts—the birthplace of Marshall Field. Marshall Field III presented the property as a gift to the Field Museum of Natural History in honor of the museum's 50th anniversary in 1944.  The museum held the property until September 1960 when the museum sold it.

Architecture
Designed by Graham, Anderson, Probst and White, the structure combines both art deco and Gothic detailing, while complying with a 1923 zoning ordinance which mandated skyscrapers setbacks. The interior of the building features a five-story atrium, lined by balconies and shops, that is detailed with glowing marbles, gleaming brass and Spanish Gothic style carvings.

Today
Alter Group, a Skokie, Illinois-based real estate developer has acquired the thirteenth through twenty-first floors of the building with plans for dormitory conversion at a cost of $23 million (about $173 per square foot).  It will finance the $45-million renovation costs with a $36-million loan from First bank and has entered lease agreements with Roosevelt University and Robert Morris University for 350 of the planned 450 beds.  Morgan Reed Group who acquired the entire building for $15 million in 2000 continues to own the remaining portions of the building.  The building is used mostly by doctors, dentists and jewelers and students will have a separate entry under the plans.

The building now has two separate short term rental operations, one known as Chicago Downtown Suites or Pangea Suites, the other as Pittsfield Suites. Both are offered on travel websites such as Expedia and Travelocity. The student dormitory (Fornelli Hall) that formerly occupied the 13th to 21st floors no longer operates at this address.

Position in Chicago's skyline

See also
Chicago architecture
Chicago Landmark
List of tallest buildings in Chicago

Notes

Office buildings completed in 1927
Art Deco skyscrapers
Gothic Revival skyscrapers
Skyscraper office buildings in Chicago
Art Deco architecture in Illinois
Chicago school architecture in Illinois
Chicago Landmarks
1927 establishments in Illinois